Mohammad Taheri (also Romanized as Moḩammad Ţāherī) is a village in Baghak Rural District, in the Central District of Tangestan County, Bushehr Province, Iran. At the 2006 census, its population was 208, in 55 families.

References 

Populated places in Tangestan County